The Song of Enlightenment, also translated as Song of Awakening and Song of Freedom, is a Chan discourse written some time in the first half of the 8th century C.E. and usually attributed to Yongjia Xuanjue. The true authorship of the work is a matter of debate, with a number of elements in the writing suggesting either the text has been substantially changed over time or Yongjia was an unlikely author. The first commentaries appeared in the 11th century during the Song Dynasty. The first English commentary on the work was written by Charles Luk. The Song deals with the methods of and attitudes towards daily Zen practice. A central theme is the contrast between dharma-nature, or reality as it is, versus buddha-nature, or self-nature. It also emphasizes practice over sutra-study. It has been considered a central Zen text from the Song Dynasty to the present day. It was apparently so highly esteemed that Dahui Zonggao reported that it was translated from Chinese to Sanskrit so it could be studied elsewhere. Today it is often memorized by Zen practitioners in East Asian countries.

References

External links
 The Song of Enlightenment, translated by Nyogen Senzaki with commentary

Zen texts